Rawl is an unincorporated community in Mingo County, West Virginia, United States. Rawl has a post office with ZIP code 25691.

References

Unincorporated communities in Mingo County, West Virginia
Unincorporated communities in West Virginia
Coal towns in West Virginia